64 de Hakken!! Tamagotchi: Minna de Tamagotchi World (Japanese: 64で発見!!たまごっち みんなでたまごっちワールド) is a party video game developed by Bandai and Hudson Soft for the Nintendo 64. It released only in Japan on December 19, 1997. It is a virtual board game based on the Tamagotchi toy. This was the first game by Bandai on the Nintendo 64 system and it is the only Tamagotchi-branded game on the system. The game introduces "Tsukuzuku Tamagotchi", a special variant of Tamagotchi.

How to play

Game setup 
To use "User Tamago" saved in the controller pack, attach it to the controller before starting the game.

First, the number of players can be selected. Up to four people are able to play and open spots will be filled by computer players (CPU).

The two play modes available are "Multiple Controller" mode and "1 Controller" mode. In "Multiple Controller" mode, each player uses their own controller in the game. In 1 Controller mode, one controller is passed around amongst each player. If the number of controllers plugged into the console does not match the number of players, Multiple Controller mode cannot be selected.

The game recognizes plugged-in controllers only at console startup, so even if more controllers are plugged in afterwards, "Multiple Controller" mode still cannot be selected.

If a CPU is playing, players will choose an "Adultchi" character for the CPU.  Depending on the chosen Tamagotchi, the CPU's playstyle in-game will differ.

Players will choose between Generation One or original "Tamagotchi" egg designs or "Shinshu Hakken! (Generation 2) Tamagotchi" eggs designs.  When players satisfy the conditions of the game and complete the game, players will then be able to use "User Tamago". Any CPU in game will select the Adulttchi egg before the start of the game.

After selecting the eggs, each player will name their Tamagotchi character. Any CPU Tamagotchi will already be named, but it is possible to change it. After this, the consequential order of players rolling the dice will be determined.

The final screen before the game starts is a confirmation screen in which the player can choose whether they would like to hear an explanation of the game's rules or not. Upon selection, the game will start.

Goal of the game 
The game is a board game that is won by being the player to advance and reach the end first by raising the Tamagotchi to the Adulttchi stage. Upon a player's turn, the player will roll dice and advance on the board as many spaces as the dice indicate. If the player pulls a card, they are able to use it or look at the board's map.

After rolling the dice and moving or using a card, players are able to use the "Care" feature on their Tamagotchi.

Occasionally, player Tamagotchi will become sick. It is possible for the player to heal a sick Tamagotchi via a care command. Tamagotchi evolution will also automatically heal it. However, if the player continues on without healing their Tamagotchi (the second and following turns after illness appears), each turn, the Tamagotchi's "Evolution Power" will decrease as the illness becomes more severe. Gradually, a skull indicating illness will become dark red and larger. In the case that the Tamagotchi is never healed, the Tamagotchi will finally die and turn into "Obaketchi". The player cannot do anything now except participate in minigames. If all player-operated Tamagotchi die, this will result in a "Game-Over" for everybody. Obaketchi will also be registered in the picture book found in Bonus Mode (Omake Mode).

Depending on the effects of the space a player stops on and the effects of the player's Tamagotchi care, the "Evolution Power" meter will either increase or decrease. When this gauge becomes full, the player's Tamagotchi will "Evolve" (After evolution, the meter will decrease, but the Tamagotchi will not revert back to its former state). Depending on how a player cares for their Tamagotchi, a Tamagotchi will follow different evolutionary paths.

The order of Tamagotchi evolution is as follows: Babytchi stage → Childtchi (Kodomotchi) stage → Adulttchi.

The player who has their Tamagotchi reach the Adulttchi stage and has the Evolution Power gauge full first will become the winner.

How to care for Tamagotchi 
Each player can only use care commands once each turn. Each player also has a set amount of "Care Energy", starting with 64 points in reference to the Nintendo 64. Each player's game piece on the board is represented by a different Tamagotchi toy device. The number presented in the Tamagotchi device indicates the consumable amount of Care Energy points. Since opportunities for replenishing Care Energy are limited, it is important for players to make sure they do not run out.

Whenever two or more players land on the same square or land in squares adjacent to each other, a "Snatching" event will occur. However, even if a player's space is snatched by an opponent, depending on the categories of the event and luck, the player doing the snatching can be defeated.

The numbers next to each command represent how many Care Energy points each takes.

 Food
 Players have the option to feed their Tamagotchi rice, meat, or vegetables. Food fills the Tamagotchi's "Hunger Meter" and increases Evolution Power +2. No matter which food players choose to feed their Tamagotchi, this remains the same. Players can also feed their Tamagotchi snacks, with the options of candy, cake, and sometimes donuts. Snacks will increase the "Happiness Meter", but will not increase the Evolution power and will make Tamagotchi more susceptible to illness.
 Games (2 points)
 Players can play games with their Tamagotchi. There are two games and one will be randomly chosen. If the player wins the game, the Happiness Meter level will increase +2. Failure will not decrease the Happiness Meter level.
 Toilet (3 points)
 Tamagotchi will occasionally poop and poop-buildup will cause a Tamagotchi to become sick easily. The maximum amount of poop on screen at one time is 8.  The toilet command will remove all the poop at once.
 Treating Sickness (Injection: 8 points, Medicine: 2 points)
 In case a Tamagotchi gets sick, there is a command for healing it. There are two options for curing: Injections and medicine. A single injection will heal a Tamagotchi, but consumes a lot of Care Energy. Medicines require more than one turn to heal a Tamagotchi, but require less Care Energy. For medicine, it usually takes two turns in order to heal, but if a player gets lucky, it may heal a Tamagotchi in one turn. If the player gives a Tamagotchi one medicine that does not cure fully and then gives an injection that does, because the effects of the first medicine will remain, so the next time the Tamagotchi gets sick, the player only needs to give the Tamagotchi medicine once in order for it to fully recover it again.
 Discipline (3 points)
 From the Childtchi stage and beyond, a Tamagotchi may rebel against the player and not listen to commands. If this happens, Care Energy that would have been used otherwise will not decrease. In the case of rebellion, the player can scold their Tamagotchi. Once the Discipline Gauge is full, the Tamagotchi will no longer rebel. Even if a Tamagotchi no longer rebels, they may refuse certain actions, which will decrease the Happiness Meter. Feeding the Tamagotchi when it is full, using the cure command when it is not sick, using the toilet command when there is no poop, etc will cause a Tamagotchi to refuse.
 Cancel
 This action does nothing.

Board spaces 
When a player rolls the dice and stops on a space, depending on the type of space, various events will occur.

GO
This is where the game starts. When a player does one lap and returns to "GO", depending on the Evolution Power and the amount of spaces the player has moved, the Care Energy can replenish. Passing through "GO" will have the same effect.
Evolution P+ (Plus)
Evolution Power will increase by 2 points. If the Hunger Meter or Happiness Meter is full, Evolution Power will increase by 4 points and if both are full, Evolution Power will increase by 6 points.
Evolution P- (Minus)
Evolution Power will decrease by two points. If the Hunger Meter or Happiness Meter is empty, Evolution Power will decrease by 4 points and if both are empty, Evolution Power will decrease by 6 points.
Card
A Card space will give one random card. Each player can hold up to 3 cards. If a player with 3 cards tries to get another card, a card being held must be discarded.
Gold and Silver, Meal and Play
When a player stops on this space and does the corresponding care command (Food or Game), the effect of that command will increase more than usual. A Silver space will do 2 times more and a Gold space will do 3 times more.
Everybody Plays
Players will compete against each other in a minigame. The winner's Evolution Power and Happiness Meter level will increase and losers' Happiness Meter level will decrease. The winner can receive 5 Evolution Power points, but if there is more than one winner, the 5 points will be distributed amongst the winners evenly, with the available points to each player being rounded down to a whole number.
Accident
There are three places near both the GO space and the exits and entrances of branching areas. Here, tubs and other obstacles will try to fall on the Tamagotchi. If a Tamagotchi can avoid the obstacles, it will receive 5 Evolution Power points. If it cannot avoid the obstacles, the Happiness Meter level will decrease by two.
Fitness
The player will play the "Fitness GO!GO!" minigame (details further down). Depending on how many rounds the player wins, the Happiness Meter level and Care Energy will increase and the Hunger Meter level will decrease. This also makes Tamagotchi more susceptible to illness.
Reizoukotchi (lit. Refrigeratortchi)
The Hunger Meter will become full. Evolution Power will not increase.
Beauty Salon
The Happiness Meter will become full. As with the Reizoukotchi space, the Evolution Power will not increase.
PHS
When a player lands on a PHS space, another player can be summoned to the same space. If a player does so, there is a risk of a "Snatching" event occurring. When summoning a player, the Happiness Meter level will increase by 1.
Casino
Care Energy will be bet and the player will play a slot machine. If the player matches images on the slot machine, the Evolution Power will increase and depending on which images and how many were matched, how much the Evolution Power increases will change. However, on this turn, the player cannot care for their Tamagotchi. There are only one of each Casino and Go spaces, but if you have a "Casino card" (details further below), you will be able to go to the Casino space whenever.
Nap
The next turn that a player stops at will not allow the player to do anything, but the Tamagotchi will rest, which decreases chances of illness.
Horror
The player will choose between three available doors. There are different effects depending on the chosen door.
 Ghosts: Depending on the Tamagotchi character, the Happiness Meter level will either increase or decrease. The Kuchitamatchi Tamagotchi line will cause an increase. The Tamatchi line, Babytchi stages, and Kodomotchi stages will cause a decrease. There will be no effect for some Adulttchi Tamagotchi.
 Restaurant: Hunger Meter level will become full.
 Toilet: Poop can be flushed away.
 Hospital (Only when sick): Illness is cured.
Lottery
The player will play a lottery. The prize won determines which space the player will be forced to move to. An event will occur if second through fourth prizes are won.
 First prize (red): GO space
 Second price (yellow): Everybody Plays space
 Third prize (green): Casino space
 Fourth prize (blue): Beauty Salon space
 Consolation prize (black): Nap space
Mikachu Shop
Using Care Energy as currency, the player can buy an item that will temporarily continue to fill the Hunger Meter over time. 
There are six available items for purchase: Hamburger, sausage, hamburger steak, spaghetti, pizza, and steak. 
Banzo Shop
Using Care Energy as currency, the player can buy an item that will temporarily continue to fill the Happiness Meter over time. This item cannot be used while a Tamagotchi is sick.
Mystery
There is a list of space options, with the exception of the GO and PHS spaces, on the screen and a pointer will very quickly pass over all of the options. The player will press a button to stop on one of the spaces listed and an event will occur.

Cards 
When a player stops on a card space, the player will receive a random card. Upon a turn, instead of rolling the dice, the player is able to play a card. The limit of held cards is 3 and they cannot be discarded, but if a player draws another card, a held card can be discarded.

3 Dice, 4 Dice
Three or four dice can be rolled at the same time. Even while a Tamagotchi is sick, there is a benefit to rolling multiple dice.
123456
Without rolling the dice, the player will receive a number and advance on the board according to the number on the card. Because there are branching paths and the type of space one might land on is uncertain, the map will come up on the screen before the player uses the card.
GO
The player will move to the GO space. If the player is stopped at GO and uses the card, the player will not proceed anywhere and Care Energy will not increase.
Fly to a Place 
A chosen player will be moved to a random place on the board. The player is able to choose themselves to be teleported.
Change Places 
The player and another chosen player's positions are switched on the board. After the switch, the events of the spaces each player lands on will occur.
Reverse
The player is forced to move in the opposite direction on the board.
Full Hunger Meter
The Hunger Meter will be filled.
Full Happiness Meter
The Happiness Meter will be filled.
Casino
The player can play at the casino. Although the rules are the same as the ones of the Casino space, the goal is to match the three images of the "7".
Disappointment
The player chooses another player and the two of the following stat changes occur to that player: Empty Hunger Meter, empty Happiness Meter, 8 poops, or Tamagotchi illness.
Naptime
The chosen player's Tamagotchi is immediately put to sleep for a one-time nap.
Give Me More Evolution P
The player can steal 5 Evolution Power points from another player.
Give Me More Evolution P
The player can steal 10 Evolution Power points from another player.
Give Me Care Energy
The player can steal 10 Care Energy points from another player.
Collect Poop
This is the only card that a player is forced to use. If a player's Tamagotchi, including the Tamagotchi of whoever plays card, has pooped, a turn will be taken up to collect all players' Tamagotchi's poop and during that turn, regular Tamagotchi care cannot take place.

Minigames 
Throughout the game, when a player lands on an "Everybody Plays" space, a minigame will be played. Games are chosen randomly through a roulette, but it is possible to time the roulette so it lands on a desired minigame. If the game is in "1 Controller" mode, only a portion of the minigames are playable (These games are indicated with an asterisk* below). They are also available in Bonus Mode, but CPU players cannot participate.

Panel BANG!
In this game, out of 16 square panels, a picture of one of the panels will pop up on the screen. Players will press the A button to shoot the indicated panel. There are five rounds and the person who has the most points afterwards is the winner. If a player gets 3 points, the game ends and that person becomes the winner.
That Way-tchi, This Way-tchi, Tama Touch!
The Tamagotchi move around on a Nintendo 64 controller and when they stop, the player must press the corresponding button their own Tamagotchi is standing on. Pushing the button as fast as possible will result in a high score. There are 10 rounds total and the person with the highest score at the end wins. The buttons that can be pressed are the A button, B button, any of the C buttons, or the directional buttons (D-Pad).
Fight! Balloon Smash! *
This is a game of reflexes. A signal will pop up and players must press the button to pop the balloon as soon as possible. There are five rounds and the player with the most points at the end will be the winner. If a player gets 3 points, the game ends and that person becomes the winner.
In "Multiple Controller" mode, players will press the A button in this game, while in "1 Controller" mode, each player will use a different button. 1P: Start button  2P: A button  3P: B button  4P: Any of the C buttons
Don't Get Shocked! *
There is a path on the screen with walls that have a flowing electric current. Using the controller's analog stick, players will move their Tamagotchi through the path towards the goal. If the Tamagotchi hits the wall's electric current, the Tamagotchi will be sent back to the starting point.
In Multiple Controller mode, all players start at the same time. The player who makes it to the goal the most within the allotted time will become the winner. In 1 Controller mode, each player will take a turn and the player who makes it to the goal in the shortest amount of time will become the winner.
UFO Catch!
Players will shift the controller's analog stick around and, by using the A button, will capture the flying UFOs on screen. Catching fast UFOs result in high scores. Once time runs out, the person with the highest score will become the winner.
Aim and Pop!
Players will control their Tamagotchi with either the analog stick or the D-pad, as well as jump with the A button, and shoot out spheres with the B button. On the screen, there are various objects to shoot. Shooting a plate will result in +1 point. Shooting a bomb will result in -1 point. Hitting a special character that will occasionally pop up will result in +3 points. Once time runs out, the person with the highest score will become the winner.
Catch the Falling Items!
Players will control their Tamagotchi with the analog stick, jump with the A button, and collect the items that fall down. Catching poop will result in -1 point. Rice is +1 point, but players will briefly not be able to control their Tamagotchi. All other items are +1 point. Once time runs out, the person with the highest score will become the winner.
Drill GO! *
In Multiple Controller mode, all players start at the same time and the player who reaches the water underground at the bottom of the screen will receive points. There are five rounds and the person with the most points at the end will become the winner. The first person who reaches 3 points will automatically become the winner. 
In 1 Controller mode, players will play by taking turns and whoever reaches the water underground in the shortest amount of time will become the winner.
Throw Poo-kun! 
Players will set their aim with either the analog stick or D-pad and attack opponents by throwing poop with the A button. Players can cancel out their opponents' attacks by throwing poop at incoming attacks. The player who gets hit by poop the least will become the winner.
If You Pull It, You Can Do It! *
Players are supposed to have their Tamagotchi pull a rope back and try to make it to the finish line. Pushing the button when the gauge becomes full will fasten the rope to pull it towards the Tamagotchi. The first person to make it to the finish line is the winner.
In Multiple Controller mode, the A button is used. In 1 Controller mode, each player is assigned a different button. 1P: Start button  2P: A button  3P: B button  4P: Any of the C buttons
Fitness GO!GO!
In order to not be pushed off by the conveyor belt, players will repeatedly push a button and try not to fall off. As the game progresses, the conveyor belt will become faster. There are up to 5 levels in this minigame. At the Fitness space, this minigame can only be played with one controller and players will use the A button. Unlike the Fitness space, though, when Fitness GO!GO! is played with everybody at an Everybody Plays space. Every player is assigned a button. 1P: Start button  2P: A button  3P: B button  4P: Any of the C buttons
If the game is played at a Fitness space, the Happiness Meter level and Care Energy will increase depending on the results of the minigame. When the game is played at an Everybody Plays space, the player who is left standing by the end becomes the winner.

Characters

Earthlings 
 Professor Banzo (Voiced by Yukimasa Kishino)
 Mikachu (Voiced by Masami Suzuki)

Tamagotchi 
 Generation One Tamagotchi characters (Mametchi, Ginjirotchi, etc)
 Generation Two Tamagotchi characters (Mimitchi, Pochitchi, etc)

Tsukuzuku Tamagotchi 
 Adulttchi that have reached first place will become a "Tsukuzuku Tamagotchi". If a participating CPU wins first place, though, the Tsukuzuku Tamagotchi event will not occur.
 Although there are collectively 24 types of Tsukuzuku Tamagotchi, which one a Tamagotchi will turn into is random. There are "Rare Tsukuzuku", which have a significantly lower chance of appearing.
 After completion of the game, Only player-operated Tamagotchi, winning Tamagotchi, and Tamagotchi that have won a certain amount of Evolution Power points can be saved as User Tamago to the Game Pak or controller pack.
 Tsukuzuku Tamagotchi characters modeled after Nintendo characters Mario and Wario appear in the game. However, getting these characters to appear in game is difficult.

Tsukuzuku Tamagotchi characters 
 Clionetchi 
 Kusatchi Modoki 
 Mariotchi (Based on Nintendo's Mario)
 Waruotokotchi (Based on Nintendo's Wario)
 Kozureoyajitchi
 Maikaatchi
 Ninjatchi
 Tsunotchi
 Togetchi 
 Suikatchi
 Nyatchi
 Charitchi
 UFOtchi
etc.

Miscellaneous information 
 The BGM was done by Maysutsuba (Tomori Kudo, CHiCO) and Hidenobu "KALTA" Ootsuki.
 In Bonus Mode, in addition to being able to view game settings, unlocked Tsukuzuku Tamagotchi evolutions, and a photo album, when certain commands are entered, the game credits and the game's minigames can be played at any time.

References

1997 video games
Bandai games
Japan-exclusive video games
Nintendo 64 games
Nintendo 64-only games
Tamagotchi video games
Video games based on toys
Video games developed in Japan
Multiplayer and single-player video games